This is a list of countries by IPv4 address allocation, . It includes 252 areas, including all United Nations member states, plus the Holy See, Kosovo and Taiwan.

There are 232 (over four billion) IP addresses in the IPv4 protocol. Of these, almost 600 million are reserved and cannot be used for public routing. The rest are allocated to countries by the Internet Assigned Numbers Authority (IANA) via the regional Internet registries (RIRs).

Charts and graphs

See also

 IP address
 IPv4 address exhaustion
 Internet Census of 2012 (Carna Botnet)
 List of assigned /8 IPv4 address blocks

References

IPv4 address allocation
Internet-related lists
IPv4